Norma Mary Williams  (née Bridson, 11 December 1928 – 3 October 2017) was a New Zealand swimmer, swimming administrator and author, who represented her country at the 1950 Empire Games in Auckland.

Biography
Born in Auckland in 1928, Williams was educated at Takapuna Grammar School.

At the 1950 British Empire Games she won the silver medal as part of the women's 440 yard freestyle relay. Her teammates in the relay were Winifred Griffin, Joan Hastings and Kristin Jacobi. She also competed in the 110 yards freestyle event, finishing in fifth place.

Williams won six national swimming titles: the 400 yards women's medley in 1948, 1949 and 1950; and the 100 yards women's butterfly in 1949, 1950 and 1951.

She married Clifford Ruscoe Ashe Williams in 1952 and the couple had three children. She was a chaperone with the New Zealand team at the 1968 Olympic Games in Mexico City, and was appointed as a national swimming selector in 1978. She also served as the president of the Auckland Amateur Sports Association.

Williams' book, Between the Lanes, which chronicles the development of competitive swimming in New Zealand, was published in 1996. She also wrote histories to mark the centennials of the New Zealand Swimming Federation in 1990 and the Auckland Swimming Association in 2006.

In the 1977 New Year Honours, Williams was appointed a Member of the Order of the British Empire, for services to swimming.

Williams died on 3 October 2017.

References

1928 births
2017 deaths
People from Auckland
People educated at Takapuna Grammar School
New Zealand female swimmers
Swimmers at the 1950 British Empire Games
Commonwealth Games silver medallists for New Zealand
New Zealand sports executives and administrators
New Zealand sportswriters
New Zealand Members of the Order of the British Empire
Commonwealth Games medallists in swimming
Swimmers from Auckland
Medallists at the 1950 British Empire Games